Black Star is an American hip hop duo formed in 1996, from Brooklyn, New York City. The duo is composed of rappers Mos Def (Yasiin Bey) and Talib Kweli. The duo is named after The Black Star Line, a shipping company founded by Marcus Garvey. Their critically-acclaimed debut album Mos Def & Talib Kweli Are Black Star was released on September 29, 1998. After decades of only releasing singles and appearing on compilations, Black Star released their sophomore studio album No Fear of Time May 3, 2022 on the podcasting platform Luminary.

History
Black Star arose from the underground movement of the late 1990s, which was in large part due to Rawkus Records, an independent record label stationed in New York City. They, together with other members of the Native Tongues Posse, helped shape underground alternative rap, bringing it into the mainstream. Both Yasiin Bey and Talib Kweli have gone on to greater commercial and critical success in their solo careers.

In 2001, Black Star performed "Money Jungle" with Ron Carter and John Patton for the Red Hot Organization's compilation album Red Hot + Indigo, a tribute to Duke Ellington, which raised money for various charities devoted to increasing AIDS awareness and fighting the disease. In 2002, the song "Hater Players" was used in an episode of The Wire, "The Cost". In 2005, hip hop website TheSituation.co.uk reported Kweli said that a new Black Star album was "in the pipeline".

A second album, to be produced entirely by Madlib, was confirmed to be finished in November 2019. It was announced in 2022 that the album would be titled No Fear of Time. It was released on May 3 exclusively on the podcast platform Luminary.

Discography

Studio albums

Singles

Other collaborations
1997: "Fortified Live", "Freestyle" from Rawkus Compilation, "Soundbombing"
1999: "Know That" from Mos Def's album, Black on Both Sides
1999: "Little Brother", The Hurricane (soundtrack)
2000: "This Means You", produced by DJ Hi-Tek on the album Train Of Thought
2001: "Money Jungle" from the Red Hot Organization's album Red Hot + Indigo
2002: "Joy" from Talib Kweli's album, Quality
2002: "Brown Sugar (Raw)", Brown Sugar (soundtrack)
2004: "Beautiful (Black Star remix)", a remix of the Mary J. Blige song Beautiful, featured on the single of the song
2005: "Supreme Supreme" from Talib Kweli's album, Right About Now
2005: "Bright as the Stars" from Mos Def's single, "Ah Ha"
2005: "What It Is" from Talib Kweli's mixtape, The Beautiful Mixtape Vol. 2
2006: "Born & Raised" from the soundtrack, Dave Chappelle's Block Party
2009: "History", from Mos Def's album The Ecstatic
2010: "Just Begun", from Reflection Eternal song also featuring Jay Electronica & J. Cole, Revolutions per Minute
2011: "You Already Knew", from Black Star Aretha, the two's tribute to Aretha Franklin.
2022: "Peppas", from Westside Gunn's mixtape 10

References

External links

 Talib Kweli – official website
 Black Star discography at Discogs

African-American musical groups
American musical duos
Hip hop duos
Hip hop groups from New York City
Musical groups established in 1997
Musical groups from Brooklyn
Native Tongues Posse
1997 establishments in New York City